Keyholder is the seventh studio album by Swedish progressive rock band Kaipa. It is the second album of the reformed Kaipa line-up.

Track listing
All songs by Hans Lundin and Roine Stolt except where noted.

Personnel
Hans Lundin - Hammond organ, synthesizers, mellotron, pianos, vocals
Roine Stolt - electric and acoustic guitars, percussion, vocals
Morgan Ågren - drums
Aleena Gibson - lead and backing vocals
Patrik Lundström - lead and backing vocals
Jonas Reingold - bass guitar

References 

2003 albums
Kaipa albums
Inside Out Music albums